Mary Simpson was a unionist politician in Northern Ireland.

Simpson was honorary secretary of the Central Armagh Unionist Association from 1974 until 1983, and was elected to Craigavon Borough Council for the Ulster Unionist Party at the 1977 local elections.  She held her seat in 1981, and served as Mayor of Craigavon in 1981/2, the first woman to hold the post.

At the 1982 Northern Ireland Assembly election, Simpson stood in Armagh.  She took only 721 first-preference votes, leaving her in last position, but she was elected on transfers from party colleagues.  At the Assembly, she served on the Environment Committee and as vice-chair of the Education Committee.  She was re-elected to her council seat in 1985, but stood down in 1989.

In 1990, Simpson served as Chair of the Craigavon and District Housing Association.

References

Possibly living people
Year of birth missing
Mayors of Craigavon
Ulster Unionist Party councillors
Northern Ireland MPAs 1982–1986